Jamhuriya University of Science and Technology (JUST) is an accredited private, higher educational institution in Somalia.
JUST was established in 2011.

Faculties
The university has currently the following faculties:

Faculty of Medicine & Health Science 

 Bachelor of Medicine and General Surgery
 Bachelor of Nursing
 Bachelor of Public Health
 Bachelor of Medical Lab Technology
 Diploma in Pharmacology

Faculty of Engineering 

 Bachelor of Civil Engineering
 Bachelor of Electrical Engineering

Faculty Computer & Information Technology 

 Bachelor of Computer Application
 Diploma in Information Technology 
 Diploma in Computer Networking

Faculty Economic & Business Management 

 Bachelor of Business Administration
 Bachelor of Public Administration
 Bachelor of Accounting & Finance

Accreditation

As of 2013, Jamhuriya University of Science & Technology (JUST) has the full accreditation of the Directorate of Higher Education and Culture of the Federal Government of Somalia.

References
Jamhuriya University Official Opening Ceremony.,
Jamhuriya University Blog.

External links

Universities in Somalia
2011 establishments in Somalia
Educational institutions established in 2011